Jassi Singh Lailpuria is a Pakistani singer-songwriter from Faisalabad. A Punjabi singer of pop and bhangra music, he is best known for his song Sohna Pakistan.

Personal life and career
Jassi is from Faisalabad, Pakistan. He is married and is father of 3 kids. In 2009, Jassi Lailpuria, launched his first song on independence day entitled, Sohna Pakistan. Jassi also wrote an Urdu book on Shaheed Bhagat Singh. He performs in many shows and events all over Pakistan.

Discography

References

Pakistani male singers
Pakistani Sikhs
Singers from Faisalabad
Living people
Punjabi people
Punjabi-language singers
Year of birth missing (living people)